Olt Kondirolli (born 14 January 2003) is a Kosovan swimmer. He competed in the men's 100 metre freestyle at the 2020 Summer Olympics.

References

External links
 

2003 births
Living people
Kosovan male swimmers
Kosovan male freestyle swimmers
Olympic swimmers of Kosovo
Swimmers at the 2020 Summer Olympics
Place of birth missing (living people)